Lophorache is a genus of moths of the family Noctuidae. The genus was erected by George Hampson in 1910.

Species
Lophorache eustrotiodes Hampson, 1910 India (Andhra Pradesh)
Lophorache fulvirufa Hampson, 1910 Somalia, Kenya

References

External links

Acontiinae